Caroline Grist is a television producer who focuses on true crime and justice documentaries. She developed the cold case TV investigative series The Eleven, Children of the Snow, and The Clown and the Candyman, and the international returning true crime series Hours to Kill.

Work in the UK 
Caroline began her career in the UK as a journalist, writing for publications like London’s newspaper, The Independent. Her TV work included the BBC programs Crimewatch and Out of Court. She produced documentaries for Channel 4, and worked on ITV Granada’s long-running investigative series World In Action.

USA 
She moved to the US to work on the TV venture between The New York Times and ITV Granada, working as a development producer on programs for the Investigative Reports series on A&E, including a critically-acclaimed two-hour special, Anatomy of 9/11. While at ITV Caroline developed the series pilot of Decoding Disaster for Discovery. She is a member of BAFTA New York, founding a scholarship to mentor young filmmakers in memory of her father John F. Grist.

At Cineflix 
At Cineflix, Caroline developed true crime TV including A Time to Kill, known as the returning international series Hours to Kill. She developed other productions including I Escaped: Real Prison Breaks and Missing and Endangered, plus the major cold case investigations The Eleven for A&E/Amazon, Children of the Snow for ID/Hulu, and The Clown and the Candyman for Discovery+.

In 2020 she set up First Story, an independent TV production company with her partner Charles Tremayne.

References

British television producers
Year of birth missing (living people)
Living people